Chen Xiyu (July 1911 – July 2000) was the 4th governor of the People's Bank of China (1973–1978). He was born in Huozhou, Linfen, Shanxi Province. He joined the Chinese Communist Party in 1936.

References
中国人民银行第四任行长陈希愈. 新浪财经. [2012-02-23].

1911 births
2000 deaths
Governors of the People's Bank of China
People from Linfen